The 2019–20 Croatian Second Football League (also known as Druga HNL and 2. HNL) was the 29th season of the Croatian Second Football League, the second-level football competition for men's association football teams in Croatia, since its establishment in 1992. The season started on 16 August 2019 and ended on 6 May 2020.

The league is contested by 16 teams and played in a double round robin format, with each team playing every other team twice over 30 rounds.

Teams
On 25 April 2019, Croatian Football Federation announced that the first stage of licensing procedure for 2019–20 season was completed. For the 2019–20 Druga HNL,  clubs that were issued a second level license: BSK, Dinamo Zagreb II, Hajduk Split II, Kustošija, Međimurje, Osijek II, Sesvete, Šibenik. In the second stage of licensing procedure clubs that were not licensed in the first round appealed the decision. On 25 May 2019, all remaining Druga HNL were granted second division license, along with third level clubs Cibalia, Croatia, Dubrava and Orijent 1919.

Changes
Lučko were relegated from the 2018–19 Druga HNL after finishing last, and Zadar were administratively relegated by the Croatian Football Federation. Varaždin were promoted to the Prva HNL as the champion of the 2018–19  Druga HNL.

Rudeš were relegated from the Prva HNL. Orijent 1919 and Dubrava were promoted from the Treća HNL West, Cibalia were promoted from the Treća HNL East and Croatia Zmijavci were promoted from the Treća HNL South.

Stadia and locations

Managerial changes

Number of teams by county

League table

Results

Top goalscorers

See also
2019–20 Croatian Football Cup
2019–20 Croatian First Football League

References

External links
Official website  

2019-20
Cro
2
Croatia